Barytheriidae (meaning "heavy beasts") is an extinct family of primitive proboscideans that lived during the late Eocene and early Oligocene in North Africa and Oman. The Barytheriidae were the first large-sized proboscideans to appear in the fossil record and were characterized by a strong sexual dimorphism.

References 

Prehistoric proboscideans
Prehistoric mammal families
Taxa named by Charles William Andrews